Choitro is the last month of the Bengali calendar. It falls from mid-March to mid-April and is the last month of Spring ( Bôsôntô). The name of the month is derived from the star Chitra ( Chitra).

Culture 
Traditionally this month is famous for what is called the "Choitro Sale" when all shopping prices fall discounted (sale) all throughout the month. It is traditionally done in order to sell away all remaining products by the end of year, so that the Haal Khata, the new account book can be opened on the New Year's Day.

Choitro Sankranti is observed in the last day of the month and the last day of the Bengali Calendar. It is celebrated more in rural areas than in urban areas, where it has celebrated for hundreds of years. It is the day before Pohela Boishakh and it more popular than Pohela Boishakh in rural areas.

Observances 
 Choitro 12 - Independence Day (Bangladesh)
 Chotiro 30 - Choitro Sankranti

References 

Months of the Bengali calendar